Marianne Krencsey (9 July 1931 – 30 March 2016) was a Hungarian stage, film and television actress.

Life and career 
Born in Rákoscsaba, Krencsey graduated as a theater director, but she was eventually mainly active as an actress thanks to her breakthrough performance in the  1954 Károly Makk's drama film Liliomfi. Also active on stage and on television, in 1966 she married her second husband, moving to the United States and basically retiring from acting.

In 2008 Krencsey received the  Officer's Cross of the Order of Merit of the Hungarian Republic.

References

External links  

 

1931 births
2016 deaths 
Actresses from Budapest
Hungarian film actresses 
Hungarian television actresses
Hungarian stage actresses 
20th-century Hungarian actresses
Recipients of the Order of Merit of the Republic of Hungary
Hungarian emigrants to the United States